Charles Jean Rigoulot (3 November 190322 August 1962) was a French weightlifter, professional wrestler, racing driver, strongman and actor.

Background 
Rigoulot was born in Le Vesinet, France and began to train with weights as a child. He was observed by weight trainer Jean Dame lifting heavy lithograph stones when Rigoulot was 16-years-old and Dame began to train and coach the teenager.

Weightlifting and strongman career 
As a weightlifter he won the gold medal in the 82.5 kg division at the 1924 Summer Olympics. Between 1923 and 1926 he set eight official world records. In 1924, he became the first person to clean and jerk more than 400 pounds, using the non-revolving barbells of that time. In 1928 he set two World Records; a clean and jerk of 360 lbs and a snatch of 253 lbs.  In 1930, he became the first person to complete an overhead lift of the Apollon Railway Car Wheels, an awkwardly-shaped 166 kg (366 lb) barbell-shaped set of train wheels used by the stage strongman Louis Uni, and the predecessor of "Apollon's Axle".

In 1925 Rigoulot turned professional and worked as a strongman in the circus, an actor and singer in the theater. In the first year of his career as a professional weightlifter Rigolout took part in a show challenge against Ernest Cadine at the Cirque d'hiver in Paris. Cadine was the former Olympic champion of weightlifting in the 82,5 kg division at the 1920 Summer Olympics. They came to an agreement to do their contest in order of Olympic-style weightlifting with 10 attempts for each, 5 in snatch and 5 in clean and jerk. Rigoulot won the challenge with 1.082,0 kg against 1.077,5 kg by Cadine and reached the highest two arms results with 120,5 kg in snatch and 156,0 kg in clean and jerk. In 1932 he became a professional wrestler and was billed as "l'homme le plus fort dans le monde" ("the strongest man in the world") and had matches with Henri DeGlane and Strangler Lewis. During World War II he was imprisoned after hitting a Nazi officer..

Motorsports career results
As a driver, he competed in the 1937 Le Mans race.

24 Hours of Le Mans results

Later life 
In 1953 he became sports director at the Cognac Distillery Ricard; he died of a heart attack in 1962. His daughter Dany Rigoulot became an Olympic figure skater.

References

External links 

Profile with pictures 
Profile
Olympic profile

1903 births
1962 deaths
People from Le Vésinet
French male weightlifters
Olympic weightlifters of France
Olympic gold medalists for France
Weightlifters at the 1924 Summer Olympics
World record setters in weightlifting
Olympic medalists in weightlifting
Medalists at the 1924 Summer Olympics
People associated with physical culture
Sportspeople from Yvelines